Gerard Piqué Bernabeu (born 2 February 1987) is a Spanish former professional footballer who played as a centre-back. Due to his tackling, ability to withstand pressure, and triumphs in his overall career, he is considered to be one of the best defenders of his era. 

Initially a talented student athlete at La Masia, Piqué joined Manchester United in 2004. He returned to Barcelona in 2008 under Pep Guardiola's leadership and helped the club win trebles in 2008–09 and 2014–15. He is one of only four players to have won the UEFA Champions League two years in a row with different teams, the others being Marcel Desailly, Paulo Sousa and Samuel Eto'o.

Piqué also represented Spain 102 times, making his debut on 11 February 2009. He played an integral role on the Spanish teams that won the 2010 FIFA World Cup and UEFA Euro 2012. He retired from the national team after the 2018 FIFA World Cup.

Club career

Early career
Born in Barcelona, Catalonia, Piqué started his career playing for FC Barcelona's youth teams as a defensive midfielder, but before he signed his first professional contract with the club, he decided to join Manchester United. The Premier League club did not pay a fee for Piqué as he was too young to have a professional contract.

Manchester United
Piqué made his debut for Manchester United in October 2004, as a centre-back, a 67th minute replacement for John O'Shea in a 3–0 League Cup victory at Crewe Alexandra. He made his full debut in January 2005 in a 0–0 FA Cup draw with Exeter City. Pique made his Premier League debut on 15 October 2005, again as a substitute for O'Shea, in a 3–1 win over Sunderland. His first league start came on 29 March 2006 against West Ham United at Old Trafford, playing at right-back, as Gary Neville was unavailable due to injury.

His performances, most notably in the reserve team, earned him a new contract, which he signed in February 2005, to run until the summer of 2009. On 4 August 2006, however, La Liga club Real Zaragoza secured Piqué on a season-long loan. The terms of the loan required Piqué to feature in at least 20 games for the Aragonese club, which he did, as he made 22 first team appearances in a successful spell, alongside Argentine Gabriel Milito, either as a centre-back or a defensive midfielder.

On 5 May 2007, it was announced that Piqué would be staying at Old Trafford for the following season. Sir Alex Ferguson had intended to assess Piqué's form at La Romareda on 6 May, prior to a meeting where the two parties would discuss Piqué's future prospects with the club. However, Ferguson was unable to attend because of airline difficulties.

Piqué's return to Old Trafford saw him make nine league appearances during the 2007–08 season. In his first start in the UEFA Champions League, a 4–0 home win against Dynamo Kyiv on 7 November 2007, Piqué scored the first of Manchester United's four goals in that match. In doing so, he became the 450th player to score at least one goal for the club. His second goal for the club also came in the Champions League, in an away match with Roma on 12 December 2007.

Return to Barcelona

On 27 May 2008, Piqué signed a four-year contract with Barcelona, with a €5 million buy-out clause. Barcelona paid a £5 million fee for the player. He expressed his joy at re-signing with his boyhood club, although he admitted he had enjoyed his spell at Manchester United:

Piqué's first goal for Barcelona came in the club's 5–2 2008–09 UEFA Champions League group stage win at Sporting CP on 26 November. His first domestic goal for the club followed two months later, on 29 January 2009, in a Copa del Rey match against local rivals Espanyol. The goal, which came from a corner kick in the 57th minute, turned out to be the game winner in a 3–2 victory for Barcelona. On 2 May, Piqué scored Barcelona's sixth goal in a 6–2 El Clásico win against Real Madrid at the Santiago Bernabéu.

On 13 May, he picked up the first trophy of his Barcelona career as he helped his club to a 4–1 victory over Athletic Bilbao in the Copa del Rey Final. Three days later, Barcelona clinched the 2008–09 La Liga title after Real Madrid lost 3–2 to Villarreal, with two games left in the season. On 27 May, Piqué played against his former club Manchester United in the 2009 Champions League Final, which Barcelona won 2–0 in Rome, completing a historic treble and becoming the first Spanish club to achieve this feat.

On 19 December 2009, Piqué was in the Barcelona team which beat Argentine club Estudiantes 2–1 in the 2009 FIFA Club World Cup Final at Abu Dhabi to complete an unprecedented sextuple. Piqué assisted Pedro's 89th minute equalising goal which took the match to extra-time. On 26 February 2010, Piqué signed a contract extension to keep him at Barcelona until at least summer 2015. On 28 April, Piqué scored in Barcelona's 1–0 Champions League semi-final second leg victory against Inter Milan, though his team went out 3–2 on aggregate.

On 7 December 2010, Piqué captained his first match for Barcelona, a 5–0 victory against Russian club Rubin Kazan at Camp Nou in the last Champions League group stage match, in the absence of regular captain Carles Puyol and vice-captain Xavi. On 28 May 2011, Piqué played in his second Champions League Final. Barcelona defeated Manchester United 3–1 at Wembley Stadium to lift the UEFA Champions League for the second time in three seasons.

On 18 December 2011, Piqué started in Barcelona's 4–0 victory against Brazilian club Santos in the 2011 FIFA Club World Cup Final at Yokohama.

On 1 May 2013, Piqué scored an own goal for Bayern Munich in Camp Nou, making the score 2–0 to Bayern. Bayern went on to win 3–0 and 7–0 in aggregate.

On 20 May 2014, Piqué signed a contract extension with Barcelona, keeping him at the club until 2019.

On 6 June 2015, Piqué started for Barça in the 2015 UEFA Champions League Final, as the club won its fifth European Cup/Champions League title by beating Juventus 3–1 at Berlin's Olympiastadion. This made Barcelona the first club in history to win the treble of domestic league, domestic cup, and European Cup twice. Piqué, Xavi, Lionel Messi, Andrés Iniesta, Sergio Busquets, Dani Alves, and Pedro are the only players to have been a part of both treble-winning teams. 

On 20 December 2015, Piqué played in the 2015 FIFA Club World Cup Final against Argentine club River Plate in Yokohama, with Barcelona winning 3–0.

On 18 January 2018, Piqué extended his contract again, this time until 2022. On 25 August 2019, he played for a full 90 minutes in a 5–2 win against Real Betis, his 500th game for the club.

On 20 October 2020, Piqué signed a contract extension that would keep him at the club until 20 June 2024, setting his buy-out clause at €500 million. On 3 March 2021, Piqué scored a last-minute header in the Copa del Rey semifinals against Sevilla, tying the aggregate score to send the game to extra time. Barcelona won the game 3–0 in extra time and advanced to the 2021 Copa del Rey Final, which the team won.

On 3 November 2022, Piqué announced that he would retire following Barcelona's La Liga match against Almería on 5 November. Starting as captain, he was substituted off to a standing ovation in the 84th minute of Barcelona's 2–0 win against. The Barça players were wearing special shirts for the game with "SEMPR3" printed on the front and Piqué's name and number on the back; "sempre" means "always" in Catalan, with Piqué's shirt number three replacing the last "e". La Liga president Javier Tebas stated he had no doubt that Piqué would one day return and become a "great president of Barcelona." Piqué was still on the squad list, named as a substitute, for the final match before 2022 FIFA World Cup, away against Osasuna on 8 November; he was given a straight red card from the bench at half time after arguing with the referee over the second-yellow red card given to teammate Robert Lewandowski in the first half.

International career

Youth teams
Piqué was a member of the Spain under-19 team that won the 2006 UEFA European Under-19 Championship in Poland. In a 2–1 final win against Scotland, Piqué put in a strong performance in defence and also contributed in attack, hitting the crossbar with a header and providing the assist for striker Alberto Bueno to score Spain's second goal.

Subsequently, he played in the 2007 FIFA U-20 World Cup, starting all six of Spain's matches and scoring a goal in the team's come-from-behind 4–2 victory over Brazil in the round of 16. However, Piqué missed the deciding penalty in the shoot-out against the Czech Republic, and Spain was eliminated at the quarter-final stage.

Senior side

On 6 February 2009, Piqué was called up to the senior squad for the friendly against England on 11 February. He played the entire match in a 2–0 win, in Seville. In his second match as an international on 28 March 2009, he was called up as a replacement for injured teammate Carles Puyol and he scored the only goal in Spain's victory in the 2010 World Cup qualifier against Turkey at the Santiago Bernabéu Stadium in Madrid. Four days later, he started in Istanbul in a 2–1 win, also in the group stage. Piqué made his tournament debut for Spain at the 2009 FIFA Confederations Cup, starting in four of the team's five matches as La Roja finished in third place.

Piqué was Spain's first-choice centre-back at the 2010 World Cup finals in South Africa, playing alongside Puyol. He started all seven matches as Spain won the tournament, defeating the Netherlands 1–0 in the final. Piqué's partnership with Puyol saw Spain concede only twice in seven World Cup matches and keep four consecutive clean sheets in the knockout stage. In Spain's 1–0 group stage defeat to Switzerland, just before Gelson Fernandes scored the only goal of the game, Swiss striker Eren Derdiyok tumbled over Spain goalkeeper Iker Casillas and accidentally kicked Piqué in the face, knocking him over and leaving him with a deep cut beside his right eye.

Piqué played every minute of Spain's UEFA Euro 2012 campaign, partnering Sergio Ramos in the centre of defence. He successfully converted the team's third penalty in a semi-final shoot-out win over Portugal. In the final, Spain recorded a fifth consecutive clean sheet in a 4–0 win over Italy. Piqué was one of three Spanish defenders included in UEFA's Team of the Tournament as La Roja conceded only one goal in six matches.

At the 2013 FIFA Confederations Cup, Piqué was the third of Spain's seven successful takers in a 7–6 shootout win over Italy at the semi-final stage. On 30 June 2013, Piqué was sent off during the final against Brazil. He received a straight red card in the 68th minute for a violent tackle on recently signed Barcelona teammate Neymar. The match finished 3–0 to Brazil, ending Spain's world record 29 match unbeaten run in competitive internationals.

In Spain's opening group game of UEFA Euro 2016 on 13 June, Piqué scored his fifth goal for his country, a late header in a 1–0 victory against the Czech Republic.

In Spain's second group match of the 2018 FIFA World Cup on 20 June, a 1–0 win against Iran, Piqué made his 100th international appearance.

On 11 August 2018, Piqué announced his retirement from international football.

On 25 March 2019, Piqué won his 10th cap for Catalonia in a friendly match against Venezuela, a few months after he had retired from the Spanish national team and led the team to a 2–1 victory.

Style of play
Piqué was a modern and commanding defender, who combined strength and tackling ability with good technique and passing. Due to his height and physical attributes, he was good in the air. Although he was primarily deployed as a centre-back, he was a tactically versatile player who was capable of playing as a defensive midfielder, a position in which he was initially deployed in his youth; he was also deployed as a sweeper on occasion, showing similarities to German legend Franz Beckenbauer, thus earning the sobriquet "Piquénbauer". He was also occasionally known to use his height as an additional attacking threat by advancing into more offensive positions, often functioning as an auxiliary striker, particularly if his team were trailing late on during matches. His ball-playing ability and capacity to read the game enabled him to form an effective central-defensive partnership with the more physical Carles Puyol, both with Barcelona and Spain. Despite his talent in his youth, he was initially accused by certain pundits of being error-prone defensively, and has been criticised on occasion for his inconsistency and lack of pace. Considered to be one of the best defenders in world football by pundits, in 2018, Pique's former defensive partner Puyol described him as "the best centre-back in the world" due to his personal development as a player in terms of his intelligence, leadership, positional sense, composure, and anticipation.

Personal life
Piqué was raised in a Catalan family. His father, Joan, is a businessman, and his mother, Montserrat, is the director of a spinal injuries hospital in Barcelona. He has a younger brother, Marc. His grandfather, Amador Bernabeu, is a former vice-president of Barcelona. During the 2017 Catalan independence referendum, he was seen by many as one of the public faces of the pro-independence movement, voting and tweeting his support in Catalan. He subsequently faced backlash from some Spanish fans for his support of the Catalan independence referendum.

From 2011 to 2022, Piqué was in a relationship with Colombian singer-songwriter Shakira. They met when he appeared in the music video for her single "Waka Waka (This Time for Africa)", the official song of the 2010 FIFA World Cup. Piqué and Shakira share the same birthday, ten years apart. They have two sons together, named Milan (born on 22 January 2013) and Sasha (born on 29 January 2015). In June 2022, the couple confirmed in a joint statement that they were separating. Piqué has been in a relationship with Clara Chía Martí since June 2021.

Piqué was the face of Mango's men's line HE for four consecutive campaign seasons between 2011 and 2012. In 2012, he lent his voice to the Catalan version of The Pirates! In an Adventure with Scientists! as the Pirate King.

Media and business interests
Piqué is the founder and president of Kosmos Holding (Kosmos Global Holding S.L.), a sports and media investment group he founded with Hiroshi Mikitani (founder and chairman of Japanese e-commerce firm Rakuten, Inc.), Edmund Chu, Nullah Sarker, and Mike Evans. Kosmos struck a deal with the International Tennis Federation for a 25-year, $3 billion partnership to transform the Davis Cup and generate substantial revenues for global tennis development. In August 2018, U.S. billionaire Larry Ellison publicly stated his support of Kosmos and his intention to invest in the Kosmos-ITF partnership. In January 2023 however, the International Tennis Federation removed Piqué and Kosmos from the partnership after they failed to meet financial obligations.

Piqué is the owner of Spanish second division football club FC Andorra, which he bought in December 2018 through his firm Kosmos Holding. On 21 May 2022, the team was promoted to the Segunda División after beating already relegated UCAM Murcia 1–0 at home, thus ascending to the second tier for the first time in their history. In July 2019, Piqué took over a majority stake in another Spanish football club – Gimnàstic Manresa. The acquisition was completed through Kosmos.

In December 2020, Piqué invested in the fantasy football game Sorare. Kosmos bought the Spanish broadcasting rights for the 2021 Copa América in a partnership with streamer Ibai Llanos, and in 2021 he and Ibai founded and became co-owners of the esports team KOI. The esports team later acquired a majority interest in Rogue, which resulted in Piqué's team competing in the League of Legends European Championship. As of 11 November 2022, he is president and owner of the Kings League, a new format soccer league in Barcelona, made up of teams whose owners are content creators from Twitch, YouTube, TikTok and Instagram.

Philanthropy
In 2020, in response to the COVID-19 pandemic Piqué (along with teammates, including Lionel Messi) committed to a 70% salary cut throughout the crisis. They further committed to donating to the salaries of all employees at the club during the state of emergency.

Tax fraud
On 10 July 2019, Piqué was ordered by a Spanish court to pay €2.1 million to the tax authorities following his conviction for image rights fraud. He had been convicted by Spain's National Court in 2016 for faking the sale of his image rights to his Kerad Project company in order to evade taxes from 2008 to 2010.

Poker tournament results
On 27 August 2019, Piqué took part in the EPT Barcelona €25,000 Single-Day High Roller Event. He finished in second place and won a prize of €352,950.

Career statistics

Club

International

Spain score listed first, score column indicates score after each Piqué goal.

Honours

Manchester United
Premier League: 2007–08
Football League Cup: 2005–06
FA Community Shield: 2007
UEFA Champions League: 2007–08

Barcelona
La Liga: 2008–09, 2009–10, 2010–11, 2012–13, 2014–15, 2015–16, 2017–18, 2018–19
Copa del Rey: 2008–09, 2011–12, 2014–15, 2015–16, 2016–17, 2017–18, 2020–21
Supercopa de España: 2009, 2010, 2011, 2013, 2016, 2018
UEFA Champions League: 2008–09, 2010–11, 2014–15
UEFA Super Cup: 2009, 2015
FIFA Club World Cup: 2009, 2011, 2015

Spain
FIFA World Cup: 2010
UEFA European Championship: 2012
UEFA European Under-19 Championship: 2006

Individual
La Liga Breakthrough Player of the Year: 2008–09
La Liga Best Defender: 2009–10
La Liga Team of the Season: 2014–15, 2015–16
UEFA Champions League Team of the Season: 2014–15
UEFA La Liga Team of the Season: 2016–17
UEFA European Championship Team of the Tournament: 2012
UEFA Team of the Year: 2010, 2011, 2012, 2015, 2016
FIFA FIFPro World11: 2010, 2011, 2012, 2016
FIFA FIFPro World11 2nd team: 2013, 2015, 2017
FIFA FIFPro World11 3rd team: 2014, 2018
FIFA FIFPro World11 nominee: 2019 (9th defender)
ESM Team of the Year: 2010–11, 2013–14, 2014–15, 2015–16
Footballer of the Year in Catalonia: 2019
 Globe Soccer Awards – Player Career Award: 2020

Decorations
Gold Medal of the Royal Order of Sporting Merit: 2011

See also
 List of footballers with 100 or more UEFA Champions League appearances
 List of men's footballers with 100 or more international caps

References

External links

1987 births
Living people
Footballers from Barcelona
Spanish footballers
Association football defenders
Manchester United F.C. players
Real Zaragoza players
FC Barcelona players
Premier League players
La Liga players
UEFA Champions League winning players
Spain youth international footballers
Spain under-21 international footballers
Spain international footballers
Catalonia international footballers
2009 FIFA Confederations Cup players
2010 FIFA World Cup players
UEFA Euro 2012 players
2013 FIFA Confederations Cup players
2014 FIFA World Cup players
UEFA Euro 2016 players
2018 FIFA World Cup players
FIFA World Cup-winning players
UEFA European Championship-winning players
FIFA Century Club
Spanish expatriate footballers
Spanish expatriate sportspeople in England
Expatriate footballers in England
Shakira